

Hans Kamecke (18 August 1890 – 16 October 1943) was a highly decorated Generalleutnant in the Wehrmacht during World War II. He was a recipient of the Knight's Cross of the Iron Cross. Kamecke was killed on 16 October 1943 near Kolpen, Soviet Union. On 27 October 1943 he was posthumously awarded the Knight's Cross.

Awards and decorations

 Knight's Cross of the Iron Cross on 27 October 1943 as Generalleutnant and commander of 137. Infanterie-Division

References

Citations

Bibliography

 

1890 births
1943 deaths
People from Halberstadt
Lieutenant generals of the German Army (Wehrmacht)
German Army personnel of World War I
Recipients of the clasp to the Iron Cross, 1st class
Recipients of the Gold German Cross
Recipients of the Knight's Cross of the Iron Cross
German Army personnel killed in World War II
People from the Province of Saxony
Military personnel from Saxony-Anhalt
German Army generals of World War II